Sir George Cuthbert Manning Woodroffe KBE (known as Cuthbert; 17 May 1918 - 29 November 2012) was an Anglican Archbishop of the Province of the West Indies. He was a long serving Anglican Bishop of the Windward Islands from 1969 until 1986. For the last six years of that period, he served as Archbishop, Primate of the Anglican Church, Province of the West Indies.

He was born on 17 May 1918 in Grenada and was educated at the Grenada Boys Grammar School. He received his tertiary education at  Codrington College, Barbados and was ordained in 1945. His first post was as a curate in St Vincent He held incumbencies in Barbados. His last post before appointment to the episcopate saw him returning to St Vincent as Sub-Dean of its cathedral. He was consecrated a bishop on 29 September 1969 by Alan Knight.

References

1921 births
2012 deaths
Alumni of Codrington College
20th-century Anglican bishops in the Caribbean
Barbadian Anglicans
Anglican bishops of the Windward Islands
Anglican archbishops of the West Indies
20th-century Anglican archbishops
Knights Commander of the Order of the British Empire